The Frederick William Cooke Residence was a historic building built 1883–1886 and located at 384 Broadway in the city of Paterson in Passaic County, New Jersey. Also known as the Cooke Mansion, it was added to the National Register of Historic Places on July 8, 1982, for its significance in architecture, industry, and transportation. It was destroyed by fire in 1991.

History and description
Frederick William Cooke started construction of the house , when he became an executive at Cooke Locomotive and Machine Works in Paterson. The brownstone house featured Queen Anne and Richardsonian Romanesque styles.

See also
National Register of Historic Places listings in Passaic County, New Jersey

References

	
Buildings and structures in Paterson, New Jersey
National Register of Historic Places in Passaic County, New Jersey
Houses on the National Register of Historic Places in New Jersey
Houses completed in 1883
1883 establishments in New Jersey
Stone houses in New Jersey
Queen Anne architecture in New Jersey
Richardsonian Romanesque architecture in New Jersey
New Jersey Register of Historic Places